The Bhagwa Dhwaj, also called Kesariya flag (Kesariyā Patākā ), is a saffron-colour flag, that served as the flag of the Maratha Empire. "It is swallow-tailed and of a deep saffron color emblematic of the followers of God Mahādeva." It was adopted by V.D. Savarkar's Akhil Bharat Hindu Mahasabha in 1915 and later by the Rashtriya Swayamsevak Sangh. It is now associated with Hindutva. Double pennant, triangle, or pennant – shaped saffron coloured flags with a tassels at its end is also used by Hindus as Bhagwa Dhwaj. Sometimes it also uses Hindu religious symbols like the Om letter or a Hindu Swastika at its center. Saffron is considered a sacred and holy colour in Hinduism. RSS sees it as a symbol of victory and strength. In medieval times, after the decline of Islamic rule in India and the emergence of the Maratha Empire there was a rise of Hindu nationalism and at that time the saffron flag was adopted by Shivaji.

References

Flags of India
Maratha Empire
Orange symbols
Religious flags
Asian coats of arms
Hindu nationalism